Say It Ain't So is the second studio album by Murray Head. It was released in 1975 on A&M Records. The album was produced by Paul Samwell-Smith, and the album features sleeve photography by Gered Mankowitz.

History 
The explanation for the title track of the album, Say It Ain't So, Joe, tells the story of baseball player Joe Jackson, along with other players of the Chicago White Sox team, following a game-fixing scandal in 1919, was denied by  Murray Head. The subject of the song is to denounce the attitude of Americans who, despite the Watergate scandal, continued to vote for Nixon. This song was covered by Who singer, Roger Daltrey, on his 1977 album One of the Boys. 

We can find on this album several famous musicians, including Bob Weston on guitar who played with Fleetwood Mac in 1973; he was also seen alongside Sandy Denny and he would play again with Murray Head on his Between Us album in 1979. Jim Cregan and drummer Gerry Conway. Former Yes pianist and organist, Tony Kaye, also appears on the song "Someone's Rocking My Dreamboat". The backing vocalists include Murray's brother, Anthony Stewart Head, as well as Liza Strike, famous for appearance the album The Dark Side of the Moon by Pink Floyd in 1973. Vicky Brown was also a backing vocalist for Pink Floyd on tour, and she also assisted David Gilmour and Roger Waters as solo artists.

Track listing
All songs composed by Murray Head, except where noted.

Personnel
 Murray Head – lead vocals, acoustic guitar, Fender Rhodes piano
 Bob Weston – acoustic, slide and electric guitars, backing vocals
 Alun Davies – guitar, backing vocals
 Jim Cregan – acoustic guitar
 Mickey Finn – rhythm guitar
  – mandolin
 Bruce Lynch – acoustic and electric bass guitar
 Brian Brocklehurst – acoustic bass
 Arthur Watts – string bass on "Someone's Rocking My Dreamboat" 
 Nick South – bass guitar
 Charles Jankle (Chaz Jankel) – Wurlitzer electric piano
 Tony Kaye – piano on "Someone's Rocking My Dreamboat"
 Ann Odell – strings arrangement, piano, ARP synthesizer
 Billy Day – organ
 Brian Johnstone – Fender Rhodes electric piano
 Simon Philips – drums
 Gerry Conway – drums
 Glen LeFleur – drums, percussion
 Pete Thompson – drums
 Morris Pert – log drums
 Fitzroy "Brother" James – congas, percussion
 Darryl "Chili" Charles – percussion
 P.J. Crotty – tin whistle
 The Tropic Isles – steel band
 Anthony Head – backing vocals
 Vicky Brown – backing vocals
 Liza Strike – backing vocals
 Sue Lynch – backing vocals
 Pam Keevil – backing vocals
 John Altman – clarinet on "Someone's Rocking My Dreamboat"
 Anthony Healey – trombone on "Someone's Rocking My Dreamboat"
 Noel Norris – trumpet on "Someone's Rocking My Dreamboat"

Production & engineering
 Paul Samwell-Smith - producer
 Martin Levan - engineer, mixing
 Robin Black - engineer, mixing
 Mike Bobak - mixing
Album cover art
 Gered Mankowitz - photography

References

External links
[ Say It Ain't So] at AllMusic

Murray Head albums
1975 albums
Albums produced by Paul Samwell-Smith
A&M Records albums
Albums recorded at Morgan Sound Studios
Soft rock albums by English artists